Frontier Records is an independent record label, started in 1980 in Sun Valley, Los Angeles by Lisa Fancher, a former employee of BOMP! Records and writer of the liner notes for the first album by The Runaways.

History
Frontier Records first found success with the release of the Circle Jerks album Group Sex. The label went on to put out records by such bands as Suicidal Tendencies, American Music Club, Heatmiser, Redd Kross, Thin White Rope, T.S.O.L., Christian Death, and the Young Fresh Fellows, among others.

On November 7, 2010, Frontier Records hosted a party for their 30th anniversary at the Echoplex in Los Angeles which featured a reunion by seminal punk band Middle Class, their first performance in nearly 30 years. The Adolescents, Rikk Agnew, T.S.O.L., the Avengers, and the Flyboys also performed.

Discography

See also 
 List of record labels

References

External links 
 Official site
 2010 Interview with Lisa Fancher on Outsight Radio Hours

American independent record labels
Punk record labels
Record labels established in 1980
Companies based in Los Angeles
Music of Los Angeles